Changwon Gymnasium is an arena in Changwon, South Korea. It is the home arena of the Changwon LG Sakers of the Korean Basketball League.

References

Basketball venues in South Korea
Indoor arenas in South Korea
Changwon LG Sakers
Sports venues in Changwon